The large moth family Crambidae contains the following genera beginning with "W":

References 

 W
Crambid